Mian Chah (also Romanized as Mīān Chāh) is a small village in Abreis Rural District, Bazman District, Iranshahr County, Sistan and Baluchestan Province, Iran. It is situated in the desert region of the country and is known for its unique culture, architecture, and history.

The village is home to a small community of people, mostly from the Baloch ethnic group, who have lived there for generations. The village's architecture is distinct, featuring traditional mud-brick homes with rounded roofs that help keep the interiors cool in the hot desert climate.

Mian Chah is also known for its rich history, with archaeological evidence suggesting that the area has been inhabited for thousands of years. The village is home to a number of historical sites, including the ancient citadel of Khorshid Khan, which dates back to the 16th century and served as a defensive structure against invading armies.

In addition to its cultural and historical significance, Mian Chah is also an important agricultural center in the region. The village is surrounded by date palm groves and is known for producing high-quality dates that are prized throughout Iran and beyond.

Despite its many positive qualities, Mian Chah faces a number of challenges. The region is prone to drought and water scarcity, which can make it difficult for farmers to grow crops and support their families. Additionally, the village's remote location makes it difficult for residents to access basic services and resources, such as healthcare and education.

Despite these challenges, the people of Mian Chah are proud of their unique culture and history, and are working hard to preserve their way of life for future generations. They are also working to find sustainable solutions to the challenges they face, such as implementing water conservation measures and promoting eco-friendly agricultural practices.

At the 2006 census, the village's population was 40, in 10 families.

References 

Populated places in Iranshahr County